Oxford City School District is a school district in Calhoun County, Alabama.  

The mascot is the Yellow Jackets. Dr. Shannon Stanley serves as the superintendent, a position she has held since 2022.

Board Members
Don Hopper
Cristy Humphries
Alex Davenport
Karen Phillips
Tony Bolton
Marvin Jones

Schools

Oxford Elementary School  

Address:	1401 Caffey Drive  Oxford, AL  36203

Principal Claire Gamble

DeArmanville Elementary School

Address:	170 School Road  Oxford, AL  36207

Principal:  Amy Copeland

Coldwater Elementary School

Address:	530 Taylors Chapel Road  Anniston, AL  36201

Principal:  Dr. Catherine Finkley

CE Hanna Elementary School

Address:  1111 Watson Drive  Oxford, AL  36203

Principal: Brian McRae  

Oxford Middle School

Grade Level:	7-8

Address:	 1750 U.S. Highway 78 W  Oxford, AL  36203

Principal:  Phillip Morrison 

Oxford High School

Address:	 #1 Yellow Jacket Drive  Oxford, AL  36203

Principal: Heath Harmon

External links
 

School districts in Alabama
Education in Calhoun County, Alabama